Demoutsantata (before 1940: Μοντεσαντάτα - Montesantata) is a village in the municipal unit of Argostoli on the island of Kefalonia, Greece. It is part of the community of Troianata. It is located 1 km south of Troianata and 6 km southeast of Argostoli.

Population

1991: 85
2011: 109

See also

List of settlements in Cephalonia

References

Populated places in Cephalonia